The 2001 Sta.Lucia Realtors season was the ninth season of the franchise in the Philippine Basketball Association (PBA).

Draft picks

Transactions

Championship
The Sta.Lucia Realtors advances to the finals for only the second time in their nine-year history during the Governor's Cup, the Realtors defeated Red Bull in the quarterfinal round and Pop Cola in the best-of-five semifinals by coming back from a 1-2 series deficit to win the last two games and enters into the championship round against the defending champion San Miguel Beermen.

With Damian Owens as their import, the Sta.Lucia Realtors won the Governor's Cup title with a 4-2 series victory over the San Miguel Beermen and captured their first PBA championship in eight years since joining the league in 1993. Shooting guard Chris Tan provided the winning triple with three seconds to go in the title-clinching 75-72 win in Game Six on December 16.

Roster

 Team Manager: Buddy Encarnado

Elimination round

Games won

References

Sta. Lucia
Sta. Lucia Realtors seasons